Hassan Pinto (born July 29, 1997) is an American professional soccer player who plays as a defender.

Club career
Born in Durham, North Carolina, Pinto began his career with North Carolina Fusion youth academy. He then enrolled at Elon University where he played for the Elon Phoenix from 2016 through 2018. He then transferred to Duke University where he played for the Duke Blue Devils in 2019.

On August 6, 2020, after leaving Duke, Pinto signed his first professional contract when he joined USL League One side Richmond Kickers. He made his professional debut for the club on October 7, 2020 against Orlando City B. Pinto came on as a 72nd minute substitute as Richmond Kickers won 2–1.

On April 9, 2021, Pinto joined USL Championship side Loudoun United ahead of the 2021 season.

Career statistics

Club

Personal life
Pinto's sister Brianna is also a soccer player.

References

External links
Profile at the USL League Two website

1997 births
Living people
Sportspeople from Durham, North Carolina
American soccer players
Association football defenders
Richmond Kickers players
USL League Two players
USL League One players
Soccer players from North Carolina
Loudoun United FC players
Elon Phoenix men's soccer players
Duke Blue Devils men's soccer players